Stephen L. Davis is a United States Air Force lieutenant general who serves as the Inspector General of the Department of the Air Force since March 2022. He most recently served as the director of global power programs at the Office of the Assistant Secretary for Acquisition, Technology and Logistics. Previously, he was the director for global operations of the United States Strategic Command.

Military career
Davis was commissioned an officer in the United States Air Force in 1989 after graduation from the Air Force Officer Training School. Afterwards, he underwent missile training at Vandenberg Air Force Base. Following time with the 321st Strategic Missile Wing at Grand Forks Air Force Base, Davis returned to Vandenberg in 1994, where he was assigned to 576th Flight Test Squadron.

In 1997, Davis was attached to Air Force Space Command. He would later become a flight commander of the 11th Space Warning Squadron. During the Iraq War, Davis was part of the Iraq Survey Group in 2004. Later, he served as commander of the 576th Flight Test Squadron at Vandenberg. After being assigned to United States Strategic Command from 2008 to 2010, he was named vice commander of the 341st Missile Wing at Malmstrom Air Force Base and commander of the 91st Missile Wing at Minot Air Force Base.

From 2012 to 2014, Davis was attached to the Joint Chiefs of Staff and from 2014 to 2016, the United States Department of Energy. In 2016 he was stationed at The Pentagon and served as a special assistant to the Chief of Staff of the United States Air Force for Squadron Revitalization from 2017 to 2018.  He is currently stationed at Offut Air Force Base, where he is the current director of global operations, United States Strategic Command.

Awards Davis has received include the Defense Superior Service Medal with three oak leaf clusters, the Legion of Merit, the Defense Meritorious Service Medal with oak leaf cluster, the Meritorious Service Medal with three oak leaf clusters, the Joint Service Commendation Medal, the Air Force Commendation Medal, the Combat Readiness Medal with oak leaf cluster, the National Defense Service Medal with service star, the Iraq Campaign Medal with two campaign stars, the Global War on Terrorism Service Medal, the Humanitarian Service Medal with oak leaf cluster and the Nuclear Deterrence Operations Service Medal with 'N' device and three oak leaf clusters.

Education
Wright State University
Squadron Officer School
Embry-Riddle Aeronautical University, Daytona Beach
Marine Corps University
Air University
Fletcher School of Law and Diplomacy – Tufts University

References

United States Air Force generals
United States Air Force personnel of the Iraq War
Recipients of the Defense Superior Service Medal
Recipients of the Legion of Merit
Wright State University alumni
Embry–Riddle Aeronautical University alumni
The Fletcher School at Tufts University alumni
Squadron Officer School alumni
Marine Corps University alumni
Air University (United States Air Force) alumni
Living people
Year of birth missing (living people)